Fabian Herz (born 7 January 1994) is a German darts player currently playing in Professional Darts Corporation events.

A policeman by trade, he qualified for PDC European Tour events via the Host Nation/European Qualifiers for the 2014 Dutch Darts Masters, 2016 German Darts Masters, 2016 European Darts Open and the 2016 European Darts Grand Prix, losing in the first round in all of those events.

He attended European Q-School in 2018 & 2019, but never got farther than the last 16, missing out on a Tour Card. He did then qualify as the one of the Host Nation qualifiers for the 2019 European Darts Open in Leverkusen, Germany. However, he lost 6–3 to Scott Taylor in the first round.

References

External links

Living people
German darts players
Professional Darts Corporation associate players
1994 births